The Mayor of Taichung is the head of the Taichung City Government, Taiwan and is elected to a four-year term. The current mayor is Lu Shiow-yen of the Kuomintang since 25 December 2018.

Titles of the Mayor

List of mayors 
This list includes only those persons who served as mayors of Taichung after the end of World War II, during the Post-War era of Taiwan. The first two mayors served were appointed by the central government of Taiwan.

Mayor of Taichung (Provincial city, directly-elected)

Mayor of Taichung (Special municipality)

Timeline

References 

 Mayors of Tainan - Memo.com.tw
 Taichung City Government

Tainan